Femina Miss Manipur Queen or Miss India Manipur Queen is an annual beauty pageant that selects representatives from Manipur to compete in Miss India, and then to Miss World, one of the Big Four international beauty pageants. The event is organised by "Robert Naorem Studio and Academy", under the guidance of Robert Naorem. It is one of the most watched beauty pageants in North East India. It co-exists with Miss Manipur, Miss Kangleipak and Miss Meetei Chanu.

History 

The Femina Miss Manipur event was first organised with the initiative of Robert Naorem Studio and Academy by Robert Naorem in 2017. It is to select representatives from Manipur to compete in Femina Miss India. Kanchan Soibam became the first to represent Manipur in the Miss India event. The general Miss Manipur contest is different from Femina Miss Manipur Queen and it has no access to Miss India event. Femina Miss Manipur is the only event in Manipur, that has connection with the national level pageant.

Controversy around Femina Miss Manipur contest of 2018  

There was mass protest against selection of Nimrit Kaur Ahluwalia as Femina Miss Manipur 2018, Since, she was a punjabi and not a manipuri local i.e. not belonging to the State of Manipur. The Kangliepak Students' Association (KSA) objected  to her being the choice to represent the State of Manipur. Later the fashion designer Robert Naorem who was incharge of the event had to issue clarifications  and assured that the contest was organised with the firm objective of promoting indigenous people through such beauty pageants. He issued clarification that the name of Nimrit Kaur Ahluwalia was approved by Miss India Organisation as an eligible candidate to participate in Miss Manipur Queen contest in accordance with the laid-out norms.

Titleholders

See also 
 Miss Manipur
 Miss Meetei Chanu
 Miss Nagaland

References 

Beauty pageants in Manipur